Patricia Willis is an American author of historical novels for middle-grade readers. She won the Western Writers of America Spur Award for her novel Danger Along the Ohio. She lives in North Canton, Ohio.

Publications 
 Danger Along the Ohio
 The Barn Burner

References

 Retrieved 2010-05-27

External links
"Patricia Willis"

American women novelists
Living people
American historical novelists
Year of birth missing (living people)
20th-century American novelists
20th-century American women writers
Women historical novelists
People from North Canton, Ohio
21st-century American women